Robert John Rankin Harvey (28 April 1897 – 14 June 1968) was an Australian politician.

He was born in Burra Burra in South Australia. In April 1946 he was elected to the Tasmanian House of Assembly as a Nationalist member for Denison in a recount following John Soundy's resignation. He was defeated at the state election in November. Harvey died in Hobart.

References

1897 births
1968 deaths
Nationalist Party of Australia members of the Parliament of Tasmania
Members of the Tasmanian House of Assembly
People from Burra, South Australia
20th-century Australian politicians